The tawny straightbill (Timeliopsis griseigula) is a species of bird in the family Meliphagidae.
It is found in New Guinea.
Its natural habitat is subtropical or tropical moist lowland forests.

References

tawny straightbill
Birds of New Guinea
tawny straightbill
Taxonomy articles created by Polbot